Southbourne is an electoral ward of Chichester District, West Sussex, England and returns two members to sit on Chichester District Council.

Following a district boundary review, part of the previous Southbourne boundaries were split into the new Harbour Villages ward in 2019.

Councillors

Election results

* Elected

References

External links
 Chichester District Council
 Election Maps

Wards of Chichester District
Southbourne, West Sussex